Nguyễn Xuân Oánh (Phủ Lạng Thương, today Bắc Giang, 14 July 1921 – Hồ Chí Minh City, 29 August 2003), nicknamed Jack Owens, was a Vietnamese economist and politician who held senior positions in the governments of both South Vietnam and the current Socialist Republic of Vietnam.

Early life and education
He was born on 14 July 1921 in Phủ Lạng Thương, today Bắc Giang, Tonkin, French Indochina. His father is Doctor Nguyễn Xuân Bái, from Đa Ngưu village, Văn Giang district, Hưng Yên province. He was educated in Western studies since at a young age. His family sent him to Paris, France to be educated at Lycee Albert. After graduating from secondary school, Oánh went on to attain a bachelor's degree in economics at the National College of Japan in 1944. Afterwards he would go on to earn his MA at Kyoto University in 1950. He would go on to pursue his PhD in economics from Harvard University in 1954.

Career in South Vietnam 
After earning a PhD in economics, Oánh worked for the World Bank Group's IFC and the IMF and taught economics at Trinity College. In 1963, he returned home to South Vietnam and joined the government. Shortly after, he was appointed Governor of the South Vietnamese Central Bank, then Deputy Prime Minister of the Republic of Vietnam. He also served as acting Prime Minister of South Vietnam in 1964 and 1965.

After the Fall of Saigon
Unlike most senior leaders of the former South Vietnamese government, Oánh and his family remained in Sài Gòn (Hồ Chí Minh City) after the Fall of South Vietnam in 1975. While senior government officials and military officers of the former Saigon government that stayed behind often endured punishment, either facing execution or being sent to a Communist reeducation camp run by the new Communist government, Oánh was spared from either fates. Instead, he was simply monitored by the new government.

He was also one of the few intellectuals of the former Republic of Vietnam who was well respected by the new Ho Chi Minh City government, led by Mr. Võ Văn Kiệt. Oánh was elected to the National Assembly of the Socialist Republic of Vietnam in 1987 and was appointed a member of the Presidium of the Central Committee of the Vietnamese Fatherland Front.

He also served as an economic adviser to Prime Minister Võ Văn Kiệt and Communist Party's General Secretary Nguyễn Văn Linh during the Đổi Mới economic reforms.

Honor 
Dr. Nguyễn Xuân Oánh was awarded the Order of the Rising Sun (3rd Class Honor marked by Gold Rays with Neck Ribbon) in November 1997, becoming the first Vietnamese citizen to receive this award. He was awarded the Harvard Centennial Medal in 1999 by the Harvard Graduate School of Arts and Sciences.

Personal life 
He was married to Thẩm Thuý Hằng, a famous actress and pageant who was awarded the title of Merited Artist of Vietnam. They have twin sons, Nguyễn Xuân Ái Quốc and Nguyễn Xuân Quốc Việt, who owned the coffee chain The Coffee Factory in Ho Chi Minh City.

References

External links
 Obituary on BBC news site

Vietnamese people of the Vietnam War
Harvard University alumni
Trinity College (Connecticut) faculty
International Monetary Fund people
Prime Ministers of South Vietnam
1921 births
2003 deaths
Vietnamese economists
Members of the National Assembly (Vietnam)
World Bank people